The following are the national records in athletics in Macau maintained by its national athletics federation: Associaçao de Atletismo de Macau (AAMC).

Outdoor

Key to tables:

+ = en route to a longer distance

h = hand timing

Men

Women

Indoor

Men

Women

Notes

References
General
Macanese Records – Men Outdoor 28 April 2021 updated
Macanese Records – Women Outdoor 28 April 2021 updated
Macanese Records – Men Indoor 6 December 2019 updated
Macanese Records – Women Indoor 6 December 2019 updated
Specific

External links
 AAMC web site

Macau
Records